EZ Aquarii is a triple star system approximately  from the Sun in the constellation Aquarius. It is also known as Luyten 789-6 and Gliese 866. All three components are M-type red dwarfs. The pair EZ Aquarii AC form a spectroscopic binary with a 3.8-day orbit and a 0.03 AU separation. This pair share an orbit with EZ Aquarii B that has an 823-day period. The A and B components of Luyten 789-6 together emit X-rays.

The configuration of the inner binary pair may permit a circumbinary planet to orbit near their habitable zone.

See also
List of nearest stars and brown dwarfs

References

External links
Image EZ Aquarii
 Solstation provides an orbital animation as well as a visualization of the habitable zone around EZ Aquarii B.

Local Bubble
Spectroscopic binaries
Aquarius (constellation)
Flare stars
0866
M-type main-sequence stars
Triple star systems
Aquarii, EZ